Sibusiso Wiseman Zuma (born 23 June 1975) is a South African former professional footballer who played as a forward or midfielder.

Club career

Early career
Born in Durban, KwaZulu-Natal, Zuma started his career for South African clubs Mighty Pa, African Wanderers and Orlando Pirates.

F.C. Copenhagen
In June 2000, Zuma joined Danish club F.C. Copenhagen, where he blossomed as a player.

In 2001 Zuma was tied for 29th place for the 2001 FIFA World Player of the Year award.

He helped the club win its second Danish football championship and was voted into the club's hall of fame for his outstanding efforts in the 2004–05 season,

In 2006 Zuma was voted number one by the fans among the greatest profiles to have ever played in F.C. Copenhagen.

According to Zuma he played his best football at F.C. Copenhagen which still feels like his second home. He enjoys legend status at F.C. Copenhagen as the best player ever to play in the club. Zuma thinks he owes everything to FC Copenhagen and that he enjoyed every day he was at the club. It is a part of his life that he will never forget. Zuma also tells that "South Africans will tell you that Zuma is a king in Denmark".

F.C. Copenhagen won its second Superliga championship in 2001 after almost a decade without becoming champions, winning 3–1 in the last New Firm match of the season, at the Parken Stadium. The 2–0 goal was a bicycle kick by Zuma, who received the ball at his chest, where he bounced it in the air, and in the same motion executed the overhead kick, volleying the ball into the far corner, out of Brøndby keeper Mogens Krogh's reach. This was voted the Danish goal of the year, and was voted the best Superliga goal of the decade in December 2009.

In 2013, Zuma's bicycle kick was voted the greatest moment in the history of F.C. Copenhagen. A monument was made to honour the greatest moment and thereby Zuma's bicycle kick. Zuma himself was invited by F.C. Copenhagen and attended Parken on 18 August 2013 where the unveiling of the monument took place. The monument was a relief of Zuma's bicycle kick.

On the day of the unveiling of the relief Zuma said: "It's an honour to be here. I love those guys. I love F.C. Copenhagen fans to dead. I am amazingly happy. It's one of the best days in my life".

Arminia Bielefeld
After five and a half years at FC Copenhagen, Zuma was sold to German Bundesliga club Arminia Bielefeld for €1 million in July 2005.

Mamelodi Sundowns
On 21 June 2008, Zuma signed for Mamelodi Sundowns. He was released in the summer of 2009 and in October 2009 he had a trial period with FC Nordsjælland, eventually being signed by the club.

Nordsjælland
On 16 October 2009, he signed a one-year contract with the Danish club FC Nordsjælland. On 8 November 2009 Zuma scored his first goal for Nordsjælland in the club's 1–0 win over SønderjyskE. When Nordsjælland visited F.C. Copenhagen on 24 March 2010 in a Danish League match, Zuma played well and was substituted to a large majority of the F.C. Copenhagen supporters applauding him. A distinctly touched Zuma claimed that the home supporters were incredible.

International career
He has represented South Africa 67 times. He played for his country at the 2002 FIFA World Cup. Zuma was the captain of South African National team at the 2006 African Cup of Nations tournament.

Personal life

Sibusiso Zuma Foundation
In 2010, Zuma opened the Sibusiso Zuma Foundation which works with young kids with HIV. The foundation also works with "prevention and education about HIV/Aids" and "the prevention of HIV infection and/or the distribution of information relating to HIV/Aids".

Zuma says: "I'm just trying to help a lot of communities here in South Africa. Especially the poor ones."

Nickname
He is also known as "Zuma the Puma" to the club's supporters and "Puma" appears on his shirt instead of "Zuma" in the Pro Evolution Soccer 2009 video game.

Other nicknames while he played in F.C. Copenhagen were Sibu or just Zuma.

Incident
On 25 June 2007, it was reported that Zuma had been involved in an incident in his home country South Africa. After an altercation there were allegations that he threatened to shoot a group of men at a party in Kokstad. The local police investigated the situation, and Zuma was prevented from leaving the country for a period, but no charges were made.

Family

Zuma told in the 2002 documentary "Zuma the Puma" that his father was never very supportive of his footballing career, never believing in him, telling him he would never be good enough, never coming to his games and always working instead. When Zuma moved to the Orlando Pirates in 1998, his father told him "The good players play on the national team." Zuma's father died the day before his son played his first game for the South Africa national team.

Career statistics
Scores and results list South Africa's goal tally first, score column indicates score after each Zuma goal.

References

1975 births
Living people
Sportspeople from Durban
Association football forwards
F.C. Copenhagen players
FC Nordsjælland players
Arminia Bielefeld players
South African soccer players
South Africa international soccer players
South African expatriate soccer players
2002 FIFA World Cup players
2002 African Cup of Nations players
2004 African Cup of Nations players
2006 Africa Cup of Nations players
2008 Africa Cup of Nations players
Bundesliga players
Expatriate footballers in Germany
Expatriate men's footballers in Denmark
Orlando Pirates F.C. players
Danish Superliga players
Mamelodi Sundowns F.C. players
Vasco da Gama (South Africa) players
SuperSport United F.C. players
South African expatriate sportspeople in Germany
South African expatriate sportspeople in Denmark